KXNP (103.5 FM) is a radio station broadcasting a country music format. Licensed to North Platte, Nebraska, United States, the station serves the North Platte area.  The station is currently owned by Armada Media.

Previous Logo
KXNP celebrated 25 years on the air in 2007.

References

External links

XNP
Country radio stations in the United States